Washington is a city in Beaufort County, North Carolina, United States, located on the northern bank of the Pamlico River. The population was 9,744 at the 2010 census. It is the county seat of Beaufort County.

Established in 1776 on land donated by Col. James Bonner, Washington is the first city named after George Washington, the first president of the United States.

History
The settlement at the current location of the city was founded in the 1770s by James Bonner on his land and was known as Forks of the Tar. In 1776, it was renamed Washington. During the American Revolutionary War, Washington served as a supply port when major neighboring ports were under British siege.

Geography

Climate

Demographics

2020 census

As of the 2020 United States Census, there were 9,875 people, 4,038 households, and 2,251 families residing in the city.

2010 census
As of the census of 2010, there were 9,744 people and 4,246 households in the city. The population density was 1,190.0 people per square mile (459.4/km). There were 4,754 housing units at an average density of 580.5 per square mile (224.1/km). The racial composition of the city was: 49.0% White, 45.50% Black or African American, 5.5% Hispanic or Latino American, 0.5% Asian American, 0.2% Native American, 0.1% Native Hawaiian or Other Pacific Islander, and 1.50% two or more races.

There were 4,754 households, out of which 22.5% had children under the age of 18 living with them, 37.3% were married couples living together, 21.1% had a female householder with no husband present, and 37.8% were non-families. 33.5% of all households were made up of individuals, and 15.3% had someone living alone who was 65 years of age or older. The average household size was 2.21 and the average family size was 2.93.

In the city, the age distribution of the population shows 24.7% under the age of 18, 8.6% from 18 to 24, 24.5% from 25 to 44, 22.6% from 45 to 64, and 19.6% who were 65 years of age or older. The median age was 40 years. For every 100 females, there were 77.4 males. For every 100 females age 18 and over, there were 70.8 males.

The median income for a household in the city was $22,057, and the median income for a family was $30,280. Males had a median income of $26,053 versus $21,641 for females. The per capita income for the city was $14,319. About 23.3% of families and 28.7% of the population were below the poverty line, including 42.8% of those under age 18 and 19.3% of those age 65 or over.

Arts and culture

 

Washington has a range of historical buildings and landmarks, with some dating back to colonial and Victorian eras. Historic sites include the Bank of Washington, West End Branch, Beaufort County Courthouse, Bowers-Tripp House, North Market Street Historic District, Rosedale, Washington Historic District, and Zion Episcopal Church are listed on the National Register of Historic Places.

A Farmer's and Artisan's Market is held regularly on the town's green areas on the waterfront.

The North Carolina Estuarium, located on the Pamlico River, includes more than 200 scientific and historic exhibits relating to the ecology of North Carolina's estuaries, the Tar-Pamlico River and Pamlico Sound. The Estuarium also includes a 3/4 mile boardwalk along the Pamlico River. 

The Turnage Theatre, a restored historic vaudeville and movie theater, reopened in the downtown area in 2014 and hosts plays and other types of live entertainment. Between 1993 and 2017 a downtown music and art festival called "Music in the Streets" was held every third Friday during summer to attract people to downtown shops and restaurants. 

A cannonball from the Union attack on Washington during the American Civil War is displayed in an attorney's office on Water Street, and many nearby towns also contain Civil War artifacts and museums. Civil War re-enacters meet in the outskirts of Washington every year.

BHM Regional Library operates the Washington Public Library.

Education
Public education is administered by Beaufort County Schools.  Schools located in Washington include:
 Early College High School
 Eastern Elementary School
 J.C. Tayloe Elementary School
 John Small Elementary School
 P.S. Jones Middle School
 Washington High School

Media

Print
The Washington Daily News was awarded the Pulitzer Prize for Meritorious Public Service in 1990 for a series of stories concerning local water contamination, making it the smallest daily newspaper in history to win the award.

In 2009, the newspaper The Beaufort Observer went from a bi-monthly print publication to an online publication.

Television

WITN is licensed to Washington.

Radio
The following radio stations are licensed to Washington:
 93.3 FM:WERO Bob 93.3
 97.5 FM:WLGT 97.5 The Bridge
 1320 AM: WTOW Washington Original Gospel Station

Notable people
Bam Adebayo, NBA player for the Miami Heat
 Herbert Covington Bonner, Democratic congressman from North Carolina (1940–1965)
 Churchill C. Cambreleng, congressman (1821–1839) and US Minister to Russia
 Terrance Copper, former NFL player
 Josephus Daniels, Secretary of the Navy during World War I, and Ambassador to Mexico under President Franklin Delano Roosevelt's Administration.
 Susan Dimock, pioneer in American medicine and women's health. Studied at the University of Zurich in 1871, and practiced in Boston.
 Tillie Ehringhaus, First Lady of North Carolina
 Murray Hamilton, actor, best remembered for his playing the mayor in Jaws and Mr. Robinson in The Graduate
 Brad Linaweaver, science fiction writer, film producer and screenwriter, magazine publisher.
 Henry Churchill de Mille, playwright and the father of film pioneers Cecil B. DeMille and William C. deMille and the grandfather of the dancer and choreographer Agnes de Mille
 Walter Rasby, former NFL player 
 Dominique Wilkins, nine-time NBA All-Star, noted as one of the best dunkers in NBA history, earning the nickname "The Human Highlight Film." In 2006, Wilkins was inducted into the Naismith Memorial Basketball Hall of Fame.
 Willie Williams, Karateka and mixed martial artist
Ryan Zimmerman, MLB player for the Washington Nationals.

Notes

References

External links

 City of Washington official website
 Washington Visitors Center
 

1776 establishments in North Carolina
Cities in Beaufort County, North Carolina
Cities in North Carolina
County seats in North Carolina
North Carolina in the American Civil War
Populated places established in 1776
Populated places on the Pamlico River